Funsi is a small town and is the capital of Wa East district, a district in the Upper West Region of north Ghana.

It has been a center of the Gurunsi area of the Upper West of Ghana. In 1948 it had 1,193 people rising to 1,405 in 1960.

Funsi is the location of the Wa Catholic Diocese operated St. John's Health Center, which serves Funsi and surrounding communities.

References

Populated places in the Upper West Region